The timeline of young peoples' rights in the United States, including children and youth rights, includes a variety of events ranging from youth activism to mass demonstrations. There is no "golden age" in the American children's rights movement.

Pre-19th century
The history of youth rights in the United States ranges from the earliest years of European settlements on North America. Poor children were routinely and legally indentured in colonial New England by the "poor laws." In 1676 Nathan Knight, an eight-year-old boy, was apprenticed to a mason, "bound... to serve and abide the full space and term of twelve years and five months." Provided food, shelter and clothes in exchange for his labor, the boy was not allowed to leave his master until he was 21 years old.

19th century
By the end of the 19th century, American children worked in large numbers in mines, glass factories, textiles, agriculture, canneries, home industries, and as newsboys, messengers, bootblacks and peddlers.

20th century
Before the 1930s children were routinely exploited in a variety of settings throughout American society. Frequently beginning their working lives before their tenth birthday, children worked in hazardous jobs at mines, mills, factories, sweatshops, and on farms, with little or no wages. Labor laws did not exist, and the common perception of the ease with which children were manipulated made them targets for a variety of rights violations.

In the 1980s the United States provided global leadership by acting as the "Tip of The Spear" among nations in crafting the Convention on the Rights of the Child, or CRC. After the United Nations adopted the CRC in 1989, the United States became a signatory nation in 1994. However, to date the country has refused to ratify the Convention, joining only one other nation in the world with that status. Among the reasons the United States has failed to ratify the Convention is the fact that the Convention clearly states that anyone under the age of 18 is a child. The U.S. government has reservations about how that would affect matters when a 16- or 17-year-old commits a crime; currently, in certain instances, such a person can be tried as an adult in the U.S. courts. Several politicians have said that many of the declarations included in the document are not issues for which the federal government is in charge. There is currently no apparent effort within the federal government to adopt the CRC.

21st century
Modern children's rights issues in the United States include child labor laws, including many agricultural settings where young people between the ages of 14 and 18 routinely work full time jobs and receive half of the minimum wage. Another common issue is child custody. Laws that make it extremely difficult for non-custodial parents to spend quality time with their children. After two hearings in Congress, children's rights during treatment became a focus.

Current status

Today, the American Academy of Pediatrics advocates for children's rights to appropriate medical care, and states that in cases of "an imminent threat to a child's life," physicians in some cases may provide treatments to children, even if these treatments are opposed by the parents because of their religious beliefs.

See also
 List of children's rights topics
 Children's rights organizations in the United States (category)
 Youth rights
 List of youth rights topics
 History of youth rights in the United States
 Student rights
 Timeline of children's rights in the United Kingdom

References

External links
 National Network for Child Care

Bibliography
 Fernadez, H.C. (1980) The Child Advocacy Handbook. Pilgrim Press.
 Edmonds, B.C. and Fernekes, W.R. (1996) Children's Rights: A Reference Handbook. ABC-CLIO.
 Walker, N.E., Brooks, C.M. and Wrightsman, L.S. (1999) Children's Rights in the United States: In Search of a National Policy. Sage Publications.
 Hawes, J.M. (1991) The Children's Rights Movement: A History of Advocacy and Protection.
 Jacobs, T.A. (1997) What Are My Rights? Ninety-Five Questions and Answers about Teens and the Law. Free Spirit Publications.

 
Child care
History of youth
Young people's rights in the United States, Timeline of
Youth in the United States